Mária Szolnoki (born 16 June 1947) is a Hungarian fencer. She won a silver medal in the women's team foil at the 1972 Summer Olympics.

References

External links
 

1947 births
Living people
Hungarian female foil fencers
Olympic fencers of Hungary
Fencers at the 1972 Summer Olympics
Olympic silver medalists for Hungary
Olympic medalists in fencing
Fencers from Budapest
Medalists at the 1972 Summer Olympics
20th-century Hungarian women